The Mystery of Banshee Towers by Enid Blyton is the last children's novel in a series of fifteen known collectively as The Five Find-Outers and Dog. The series ran for eighteen years, from 1943 to this one, published in 1961.

Plot summary
During a school holiday, the children are told by their parents to spend their time visiting sites in the surrounding countryside, rather than searching for mysteries in the village. The children visit an old stately home, Banshee Towers, which is exhibiting famous sea paintings, which Ern and Bets love. The Towers are reputedly haunted and wailing noises are driving visitors away. On a subsequent visit, Ern spots that a small boat he admired on the painting is missing. On pointing this out to the owner, the children unwittingly place themselves in danger. After investigating, they discover the owner of the Towers has been conspiring with an art forger and a second member of staff to replace the collection with copies and sell the originals. The novel ends with Fatty saying they will have many more mysteries to solve.

This book is a standalone in that the Five Find Outers enter a cave and a secret passage for the first time in their history, more resembling the Famous Five. The mystery is not divided up by assigning investigative tasks to each of the five children as was normally the case, and Fatty more or less solves this one on his own.

Characters 

The Five Find-Outers and the Dog
 Frederick Algernon "Fatty" Trotteville – the leader of the Five Find-Outers
 Laurence "Larry" Daykin – a member of the Five 
 Margaret "Daisy" Daykin – a member of the Five
 Philip "Pip" Hilton – a member of the Five
 Elizabeth "Bets" Hilton – a member of the Five
 Ernest "Ern" Goon – Mr Goon's nephew and the Five's friend 
 Buster – Fatty's jet-black Scottish Terrier
 Bingo – pet dog of Ern

The Police Force
 Theophilus Goon  – the local policeman and a rival of the five 
 Superintendent Jenks – the police superintendent and the five's friend

The "Jolly Bad Lot" persons
 Flint
 Mr. Engler
 Poussin 
 Francois Henri Ortalo

Footnotes

External links
Enid Blyton Society page

1961 British novels
Novels by Enid Blyton
Methuen Publishing books
Children's mystery novels
1961 children's books